The Festspielhaus Baden-Baden is Germany’s largest opera and concert house, with a 2,500 seat capacity.

The building was originally built in 1904 as Baden-Baden central railway station. This building replaced the original railway station which was constructed in 1845 as a part of branchline which connecting Baden-Baden station in the western outskirt and the city center. The building served as a railway station for several decades until the closure of the branchline in 1977.

The new construction was architecturally integrated with the former Baden-Baden railway station - today encompassing the box office, Festspielhaus restaurant “Aida” and  Children's Music World “Toccarion” by the Sigmund Kiener Foundation - and was opened on 18 April 1998.
Wilhelm Holzbauer of Vienna was the architect of the new construction. Following initial public start-up funding, the Festspielhaus successfully converted to become the first privately financed European opera and concert company. This had been the original objective.

Since March 2000, the privately managed Festspielhaus Baden-Baden Cultural Foundation has been responsible for operating the non-profit limited company (gGmbH), whilst Andreas Mölich-Zebhauser has held the role of General Manager and Artistic Director since July 1998. 
It is the only German opera house to have operated successfully without external subsidies since the year 2000. The town and country will reacquire the property from a private investor.

A coterie of approximately 2000 private sponsors - including “Friends of the Festspielhaus”, a 1,500 member registered society – annually support the Festspielhaus programme to the tune of around eight million Euros.
About two-thirds of the approximately 20 million Euro budget is financed by ticket sales, gastronomy sales and royalties, with the remaining one-third coming from private donations and sponsorships.

The average annual audience attendance capacity encompassing all the concert, opera and ballet performances is approximately 85% (2013). 
The Festspielhaus Baden-Baden also operates its own travel agency and organises cultural journeys to Baden-Baden. 
In a study carried out by the University of St. Gallen in 2008, the conclusion was drawn that the Festspielhaus Baden-Baden generated additional annual income of around 45 million Euros, greatly benefitting the town and surrounding region of Baden-Baden. 
[1].

Programme 
The Festspielhaus Baden-Baden season begins in September and runs until late July of the following year. Festival phases are opened by premieres of newly staged operas. Currently this takes place at the Easter Festival featuring the Berlin Philharmonic Orchestra (which took place in Salzburg from 1967 to 2012), at the Whitsun Festival and at the Summer Festival.

The Autumn Festival offers a programme which includes operatic concert performances and solo concerts featuring prominent musicians. 
Between the festival phases, famous ballet companies including the Hamburg Ballet - John Neumeier (Autumn) and the Mariinsky Ballet St. Petersburg (Advent) take to the Baden-Baden stage as guests, in addition to modern dance companies from around the world. 
Numerous concerts starring renowned artists – including classical music, jazz evenings, entertainment shows and musicals - complete the programme.  
Since 2008 The Festspielhaus Baden-Baden has run an extensive, privately sponsored children's and youth programme, comprising children's music festivals, children's operas, artist encounters (master classrooms) and workshops.

Every season, approximately 3,000 school students are guests at events in the Festspielhaus as part of the school project “Columbus – Discover Classical Music” (financed by Grenke AG), and prepare for their visit beforehand during class. The corresponding collaboration with the Karlsruhe Regional Council (since 2010) is unique nationwide. 
The Children's Music World Toccarion by the Sigmund Kiener Stiftung (since 2013) also has its residence in the Festspielhaus Baden-Baden and is open throughout the entire year (www.toccarion.de).

Large opera productions to have taken place in the Festspielhaus Baden-Baden until now include:

 La traviata (Valery Gergiev, Conductor / Philippe Arlaud, Director, 2001),
 The Abduction from the Seraglio (Die Entführung aus dem Serail), (Marc Minkowski, Conductor / Macha Makaieff and Jérôme Deschamps, Directors, 2003),
 Der Ring des Nibelungen (Valery Gergiev, Conductor and Concept / George Tsypin, Stage design, 2003/2004),
 Rigoletto (Thomas Hengelbrock, Conductor / Philippe Arlaud, Director, 2004)
 Parsifal (Kent Nagano, Conductor / Nikolaus Lehnhoff, Director, 2004)
 The Magic Flute (Claudio Abbado, Conductor / Daniele Abbado, Director, 2005)
 Lohengrin (Kent Nagano, Conductor / Nikolaus Lehnhoff, Director, 2006)
 Falstaff (Thomas Hengelbrock, Conductor / Philippe Arlaud, Director, 2007)
 Tosca (Eivind Gullberg Jensen, Conductor / Nikolaus Lehnhoff, Director, 2007)
 Fidelio (Claudio Abbado, Conductor / Chris Kraus, Director, 2008)
 Tannhäuser (Philippe Jordan, Conductor / Nikolaus Lehnhoff, Director, 2008)
 Der Rosenkavalier (Christian Thielemann, Conductor / Herbert Wernicke, Director, 2009)
 Der Freischütz (Thomas Hengelbrock, Conductor / Robert Wilson, Director, 2009)
 Elektra (Christian Thielemann, Conductor / Herbert Wernicke, Director, 2010)
 Ariadne auf Naxos (Christian Thielemann, Conductor / Philipp Arlaud, Director, 2012)
 L'elisir d'amore (The Elixir of Love), (Pablo Heras-Casado, Conductor / Rolando Villazón, Director, 2012)
 The Magic Flute (Sir Simon Rattle, Conductor / Robert Carsen, Director, 2013)
 Don Giovanni (Thomas Hengelbrock, Conductor / Philipp Himmelmann, Director, 2013)
 Manon Lescaut (Sir Simon Rattle, Conductor / Sir Richard Eyre, Director, 2014)

The Berlin Philharmonic Orchestra, the Vienna Philharmonic Orchestra, the Saxon State Orchestra Dresden, the Bamberg Symphony Orchestra, the Concertgebouw Orkest Amsterdam, the Balthasar Neumann Ensemble, and the leading orchestras from the US, Great Britain and Italy perform regularly in the Festspielhaus. 
Baden-Baden opera productions are developed in part as co-productions, with stages including the New York Metropolitan Opera: Iolanta (2015), Manon Lescaut (2016), Tristan und Isolde (2017); also with the Operá de Bastille (Paris / The Magic Flute 2014/2015).

A large number of productions from the Festspielhaus Baden-Baden have been released on DVD and Blu-ray. These include the operas Lohengrin, Tannhäuser, Parsifal, Der Rosenkavalier, Ariadne auf Naxos, L'elisir d'amore, and ballets including Death in Venice (John Neumeier), St. Matthew Passion (John Neumeier) and Sacre (Aterballetto). 
CDs released include recordings featuring Edita Gruberova (Norma) and Rolando Villazón (Mozart opera cycle on Deutsche Grammophon).
The media partners of the Festspielhaus Baden-Baden are the Südwestrundfunk (SWR) and the television station arte.

Since 2003 the Festspielhaus Baden-Baden Cultural Foundation has awarded the annual Herbert von Karajan Music Prize.

See also
Baden-Baden station, the current railway station that serves Baden-Baden.

External links 

Official website of the house for all information 
(1) Sven Prange, Claudia Schumacher: Der Subventionsstadl. In: Handelsblatt, Nr. 65, 30. März 2012, S. 64–69.

Opera houses in Germany
Buildings and structures in Baden-Baden
Music venues completed in 1998
Theatres completed in 1998